Julie Evelyn Joyce (born 31 January 1983) is a Canadian author based in Ottawa, Ontario. Her debut novel, Steeped In Love, won the 2019 Kobo Emerging Writer Prize in the romance genre. In August, 2019, Steeped in Love was the Together We Read: Canada digital book club selection.
 
Joyce's first written works were pieces of Gilmore Girls fan fiction which helped her to hone her skills in the craft. Prior to becoming a novelist, she wrote short stories under a pen name with a small press. Through the encouragement of her mother, Joyce started writing a full-length novel, Steeped in Love, which she self-published in 2018. Joyce's mother died shortly after she began writing the manuscript.
 
Her second book in the Make Me a Match series, Learning to Love, released in December, 2020. Book three, Love Unleashed, is set to release in October, 2021.
 
Joyce teaches high school physical education.

References 

1983 births
Living people
21st-century Canadian women writers
21st-century Canadian novelists
Canadian schoolteachers
Canadian women novelists
Canadian women short story writers
People from Clarington
Writers from Ontario
21st-century Canadian short story writers